Haystack Mountain is a mesa approximately  east of Prewitt in McKinley County, New Mexico, United States.

Geography
Haystack Mountain is a lone peak in the Zuni Mountains range in the southeast part of the Colorado Plateau and is clearly visible from nearby Interstate 40.

History
From 1950 to 1980, this area was one of the highest uranium producing regions in the country.

The Haystack Archaeological District is a protected area on the side of the mesa which is on the National Register of Historic Places as an Anasazi dwelling from 500–1500 AD.

References

External links
National Park Service Gallery information about Haystack Arch. Dist.
USGS Topo map from 2010 showing Uranium deposits
New Mexico Bureau of Geology & Mineral Resources

Mountains of New Mexico
Mountains of McKinley County, New Mexico